HD 34880 is a blue giant star of magnitude 6.41 in the constellation of Orion. It is 679 light years from the solar system.

Observation 
This star is very narrowly in the southern celestial hemisphere; this means that it can be observed from all the inhabited regions of the Earth without any difficulty and that it is invisible only far beyond the Arctic polar circle. It appears near or below the horizon, depending on season as circumpolar in innermost areas of the Antarctic continent. Being of magnitude 6.4, it is observable with the naked eye only in ideal conditions; it is easy to observe with a small pair of binoculars.

The best period for the night-time observation of Orion in either hemisphere is between late October and April. Owing to the position of the star close to the celestial equator (zodiac), it is obscured by the sun or its glare at other times of the year.

Physical traits 
The star is a blue giant with an absolute magnitude of -0.18 and it has a positive radial velocity indicating that the star is moving away from the solar system.

Multiple star 
HD 34880 is a multiple system: made up of 3 components. The main component A is a star appearing with magnitude 6.41. The B component has magnitude 11.0, separated by 4.4 arc seconds from A at position angle 285 degrees (from north). Component C is of magnitude 9.1, separated by 0.5 arc seconds from A. Its position angle is about 196 degrees.

References

External links 

 Simbad link
 Catalog of Components of Double and Multiple Stars VizieR entry

B-type bright giants
034880
024925
1759
Durchmusterung objects
Orion (constellation)